Hamon may refer to:

Hamon (swordsmithing), the visual result of the tempering process used in much of Japanese swordsmithing
Hamon, the Japanese practice of excommunication from a dojo or apprenticeship
The Ripple (波紋, Hamon), a supernatural ability used in the manga series JoJo's Bizarre Adventure
Hamon, the name for ham in Filipino cuisine

People
Augustin Hamon (1862–1945), French anarchist
Benoît Hamon (born 1967), French politician
Chris Hamon (born 1970), Jersey footballer
Jake L. Hamon, Jr. (1902–1985), American oilman
James Hamon (born 1995), Guernsey footballer
Jean-Louis Hamon (1821–1874),  French painter
Rei Hamon (1919-2008), New Zealand artist

Mythology
Baʿal Hammon, the chief god of Carthage also sometimes spelled "Hamon"

See also
Hammon (disambiguation)
Haman (disambiguation)
Jamon (disambiguation)
Fitzhamon

Surnames of Breton origin
Breton-language surnames